Kamel Chebli (born 9 March 1954) is a Tunisian football defender who played for Tunisia in the 1978 FIFA World Cup. He played for Club Africain.

References

1954 births
Living people
Tunisian footballers
Tunisia international footballers
Association football defenders
Club Africain players
1978 FIFA World Cup players
1978 African Cup of Nations players
AS Marsa managers